Jessica Fernández (born 19 July 1979) is a former professional tennis player from Mexico.

Biography
Fernández holds the Mexico Fed Cup record for most ties played, which stands at 29. She started out as a 15-year old in 1995 and on debut played one of the longest Fed Cup matches in history when she defeated Colombia's Carmiña Giraldo, 13–11 in the third set.

As a junior, Fernández was an Orange Bowl doubles finalist and twice made the quarter-finals of the girls' doubles at the US Open.

Fernández reached a best singles ranking on the professional tour of 195 in the world. She made her first WTA Tour main draw appearance in 1998, featuring in the doubles at Quebec City with Tracy Singian. Her only singles appearance in a main draw came at Acapulco in 2004, where she competed as a wildcard and was beaten in the first round by Ukrainian player Julia Vakulenko.

Retiring from professional tennis in 2004, Fernández was the last Mexican female player to be ranked in the world's top 200 for singles until Marcela Zacarías in 2015.

ITF finals

Singles (1–2)

Doubles (2–3)

References

External links
 
 
 

1979 births
Living people
Mexican female tennis players
20th-century Mexican women
21st-century Mexican women